Palace of Culture (wénhuà gōng) or House of Culture (Polish: dom kultury) is a common name (generic term) for major club-houses (community centres) in the former Soviet Union and the rest of the Eastern bloc.

In the Soviet Union, the system of House of Cultures was based on already existing Imperial Russian system of People's House that was established back in 1880s. It has several variations such as Palace of Arts, Palace of Sports, Palace of Pioneers, Palace of Metallurgists, House of the Red Army and others.

Description
As an establishment for all kinds of recreational activities and hobbies: sports, collecting, arts, etc., the Palace of Culture was designed to have room for multiple uses. A typical Palace contained one or several cinema halls, concert hall(s), dance studios (folk dance, ballet, ballroom dance), various do-it-yourself hobby groups, amateur-radio groups, amateur-theatre studios, amateur musical studios and bands, lectoriums (lecture halls), and many more. Groups were also subdivided by age of participants, from children to retirees. A public library may sometimes have been housed in the Palace of Culture as well.  All hobby groups were free of charge until most recent times, when many hobbies with less official recognition were housed based on "self-repayment". A Palace of Culture was sometimes called a "club", but this did not mean that it was membership-based.

In official rhetoric, all these were supposed to aid the "cultural leisure" of Soviet workers and children and to fight "cultureless leisure", such as drinking and hooliganism.

Palaces or Houses of Culture were introduced in the early days of the Soviet Union, inheriting the role that was earlier fulfilled by so-called "People's Houses". Below is an excerpt from John Dewey's Impressions of Soviet Russia and the revolutionary world (1929).
The other impression I would record came from a non-official visit to a House of Popular Culture.  Here was a fine new building in the factory quarter, surrounded by recreation grounds, provided with one large theater, four smaller assembly halls, fifty rooms for club meetings, recreation and games, headquarters for trade unions, costing two million dollars, frequented daily—or rather, nightly—by five thousand persons as a daily average.  Built and controlled, perhaps, by the government?  No, but by the voluntary efforts of the trade unions, who tax themselves two percent of their wages to afford their collective life these facilities.  The House is staffed and managed by its own elected officers.  The contrast with the comparative inactivity of our own working men and with the quasi-philanthropic quality of similar enterprises in my own country left a painful impression.  It is true that this House—there is already another similar one in Leningrad—has no intrinsic and necessary connection with communistic theory and practice. The like of it might exist in any large modern industrial center.  But there is the fact that the like of it does not exist in the other and more highly developed industrial centers.  There it is in Leningrad, as it is not there in Chicago or New York...

There were two basic categories of Palaces of Culture: those owned by the state and those owned by the  enterprise. Every town, kolkhoz and sovkhoz had a central Palace or House of Culture. Major industrial enterprises had their own Palaces of Culture, managed by the corresponding trade unions. 

Palaces of Culture served another important purpose: they housed local congresses and conferences of the regional divisions of the Communist Party, the Komsomol, etc.

In smaller rural settlements similar establishments of lesser scope were known as "clubs", with main activities there being dance nights and cinema. 

In 1988 there were over 137,000 club establishments in the Soviet Union.

In the People's Republic of China, the best-known, and most centrally located, Palace of Culture is perhaps the "Workers' Palace of Culture" located in the former Imperial Ancestral Temple just outside the Forbidden City in Beijing.

The concept and the name of a "House of Culture" also appears in (for example) France, Belgium and Quebec.

Post-Soviet times 

Most Palaces of Culture continue to exist after the dissolution of the Soviet Union, but their status, especially the financial one, changed significantly, for various reasons.

Notable palaces of Culture

Palace of Culture of Žiežmariai (Lithuania)
Palace of Culture of Tirana (Albania)
National Palace of Culture (Sofia, Bulgaria)
Palace of Culture of Prague (Czechia)
Palace of Culture and Science (Warsaw, Poland)
Palace of Culture (Iași) (Romania)
Palace of Culture of Kokshetau (Kazakhstan)
Palace of Culture (Târgu Mureș) (Romania)
Gorbunov Palace of Culture (Moscow, Russia)
Cultural Palace of Nationalities (Beijing, China)
Palacio de Cultura Banamex (Mexico City, Mexico)
National Palace of Culture, Managua, Nicaragua
Palace of Culture Energetik (abandoned Palace in Pripyat, Ukraine)
Kominkan (Japanese equaivalent)
VEF Palace of Culture of Riga (Latvia)
Kulturpalast (Palace of Culture Dresden, Germany)

Other Soviet entertainment complexes (Dvorets)
 Palace of Sports
 Palace of Arts and Creativity, a variation of Palace of Culture (i.e. Tolyatti Palace of Arts and Creativity, Palace of Arts "Ukraina")
 Pioneers Palace (House of Young Pioneers)
 House of the Red Army (DKA)
 House of Military Officers
 Palace of the Soviets

See also 
Cultural center
Institute of Culture
 Mechanics' institutes
 People's House, previous term that existed in the Russian Empire

References

Soviet culture
Cultural centers